St Kilda Cricket Club is a  cricket club playing in Victorian Premier Cricket, the elite club cricket competition in Melbourne, Australia.The club's home ground is the St Kilda Cricket Ground, more commonly known as Junction Oval.

History

The club was founded in 1855, beginning as an amateur club. 

It played its first season of premier cricket in 1906–07.  It is the second-most successful club in the competition with 18 first-XI premierships and 52 premierships across all grades.

Notable players 
The club's famous players include: 

 Bert Ironmonger
 Jack Hill
 Don Blackie
 Bill Ponsford
 Shane Warne
 Michael Beer
 Rob Quiney
 Peter Handscomb.
 Marcus Harris

References

External links

Cricinfo - Grounds - Junction Oval, Melbourne Australia

Victorian Premier Cricket clubs
Cricket clubs in Melbourne
1855 establishments in Australia
Cricket clubs established in 1855
Cricket in Melbourne
Cricket club
Sport in the City of Port Phillip